Aglaophamus is a genus of free-burrowing nephtyid worms.

Species 
According to the World Register of Marine Species (WoRMS), the following species with accepted names are species within the genus Aglaophamus:

 Aglaophamus agilis (Langerhans, 1880)
 Aglaophamus amakusaensis (Imajima & Takeda, 1985)
 Aglaophamus australiensis (Fauchald, 1965)
 Aglaophamus circinata (Verrill in Smith & Harger, 1874)
 Aglaophamus dibranchis (Grube, 1877)
 Aglaophamus dicirroides (Fauchald, 1968)
 Aglaophamus digitatus (Hartman, 1967)
 Aglaophamus elamellatus (Eliason, 1951)
 Aglaophamus erectanoides (Hartmann-Schröder, 1965)
 Aglaophamus erectans (Hartman, 1950)
 Aglaophamus eugeniae (Fauchald, 1972)
 Aglaophamus fabrun (Franco & Rizzo, 2016)
 Aglaophamus foliocirrata (Rainer & Kaly, 1988)
 Aglaophamus foliosa (Pérez-Torrijos, Hernández-Alcántara & Solís-Weiss, 2009)
 Aglaophamus foliosus (Hartman, 1967)
 Aglaophamus fossae (Fauchald, 1972)
 Aglaophamus gippslandicus (Rainer & Hutchings, 1977)
 Aglaophamus groenlandiae (Hartman, 1967)
 Aglaophamus hedlandensis (Rainer & Kaly, 1988)
 Aglaophamus heteroserrata (Hartmann-Schröder, 1965)
 Aglaophamus igalis (Hartman, 1965)
 Aglaophamus japonicus (Imajima & Takeda, 1985)
 Aglaophamus jeffreysii (McIntosh, 1885)
 Aglaophamus juvenalis (Kinberg, 1866)
 Aglaophamus lobatus (Imajima & Takeda, 1985)
 Aglaophamus longicephalus (Hartman, 1976)
 Aglaophamus longicirrata (Pérez-Torrijos, Hernández-Alcántara & Solís-Weiss, 2009)
 Aglaophamus lutreus (Baird, 1873)
 Aglaophamus lyratus (Kinberg, 1866)
 Aglaophamus lyrochaeta (Fauvel, 1902)
 Aglaophamus macroura (Schmarda, 1861)
 Aglaophamus malmgreni (Théel, 1879)
 Aglaophamus munamaorii (Gibbs, 1971)
 Aglaophamus orientalis (Fauchald, 1968)
 Aglaophamus paucilamellata (Fauchald, 1972)
 Aglaophamus peruana (Hartman, 1940)
 Aglaophamus phuketensis (Nateewathana & Hylleberg, 1986)
 Aglaophamus polyphara (Schmarda, 1861)
 Aglaophamus posterobranchus (Hartman, 1967)
 Aglaophamus profundus (Rainer & Hutchings, 1977)
 Aglaophamus pulcher (Rainer, 1991)
 Aglaophamus sinensis (Fauvel, 1932)
 Aglaophamus surrufa (Fauchald, 1972)
 Aglaophamus tabogensis (Monro, 1933)
 Aglaophamus tepens (Fauchald, 1968)
 Aglaophamus toloensis (Ohwada, 1992)
 Aglaophamus trissophyllus (Grube, 1877)
 Aglaophamus uruguayi (Hartman, 1953)
 Aglaophamus urupani (Nateewathana & Hylleberg, 1986)
 Aglaophamus verrilli (McIntosh, 1885)
 Aglaophamus victoriae (Rainer & Kaly, 1988)
 Aglaophamus vietnamensis (Fauchald, 1968)
 Aglaophamus virginis (Kinberg, 1865)
 Aglaophamus dicirris (Hartman, 1945 )
 Aglaophamus lobophora (Hartman, 1940)  
 Aglaophamus minusculus (Hartman, 1965) 
 Aglaophamus neotenus (Noyes, 1980) 
 Aglaophamus ornatus (Hartman, 1967) 
 Aglaophamus rubella (Michaelsen, 1897) 
 Aglaophamus rubellus (Michaelsen, 1896)

References 

Annelid genera
Phyllodocida